Eucalyptus banksii, commonly known as the Tenterfield woollybutt, is a tree that is endemic to eastern Australia. It has rough fibrous or flaky bark, lance-shaped to curved leaves, flower buds without a pedicel in groups of seven in leaf axils, white flowers and hemispherical to cup-shaped or conical fruit.

Description
The bark on the trunk and larger branches is greyish, fibrous or flaky but smooth and yellow on the branches. Flowering occurs in autumn and the flowers are white.

Taxonomy and naming
Eucalyptus banksii was first formally described in 1905 by Joseph Maiden from a specimen collected by John Luke Boorman "on the sides of hills at an elevation of about 3,500 feet in the Wallangarra district". The description was published in Proceedings of the Linnean Society of New South Wales and the specific epithet (banksii) honours Joseph Banks.

Distribution and habitat
Tenterfield woollybutt grows mostly in granitic soils on hillslopes and occurs between Cunninghams Gap and the McPherson Range in Queensland south to Armidale in New South Wales.

References

banksii
Myrtales of Australia
Flora of New South Wales
Flora of Queensland
Trees of Australia
Plants described in 1905
Taxa named by Joseph Maiden